The jezail or jezzail (ultimately from the plural form , "long [barrels]") is a simple, cost-efficient and often handmade long arm commonly used in South Asia and parts of the Middle East in the past. It was popular amongst the Pashtun tribesmen, who deposed Shah Shuja and were primarily utilized in the First and Second Anglo-Afghan Wars by Pashtun tribesmen.

Features

Jezails were generally handmade weapons, and consequently they varied widely in their construction. Jezails were seen as very personal weapons, and unlike the typical military weapons of the time which were very plain and utilitarian, jezails tended to be well crafted and were usually intricately decorated. 

Jezails tended to have very long barrels. Such lengths were never common in European rifles (with the exception of the Spanish  circa 15th century), but were more common in American rifles, such as the Kentucky rifle. The American rifles were used for hunting, and tended to be of a smaller caliber (.35 to .45 or so being typical). Jezails were usually designed for warfare, and therefore tended to be of larger calibers than the American rifles, with .50 to .75 caliber and larger being common. Larger calibers were possible because the long length of the typical jezail meant that it was heavier than typical muskets of the time. The heavy weight of the jezail allowed the rifle itself to absorb more energy from the round, imparting less recoil to the weapon's user.

Many jezails were smooth bore weapons, but some had their barrels rifled. The rifling, combined with the barrel's long length, made these weapons very accurate for their time.

The firing mechanism was typically either a matchlock or a flintlock. Since flintlock mechanisms were complex and difficult to manufacture, many jezails used the lock mechanism from captured or broken Brown Bess muskets.

The stocks were handmade and ornately decorated, featuring a distinctive curve which is not seen in the stocks of other muskets. The function of this curve is debated; it may be purely decorative, or it may have allowed the jezail to be tucked under the arm and cradled tightly against the body, as opposed to being held to the shoulder like a typical musket or rifle. The argument against this method of firing is that the flash pan would be dangerously close to the face and the weapon would be harder to aim. It is more likely that the rifle was only tucked under the arm whilst riding a horse or a camel. The curve may also have saved weight; by shaving away some of the heavy wood used for the stock through employment of the new curved shape, whilst maintaining the same structural integrity of the stock it could still be fired from the shoulder safely whilst also being lighter. The weapon was fired by grasping the stock near the trigger, like a pistol, while the curved portion is tucked under the shooter's forearm, allowing the rifle to be fired with one hand while mounted.

Jezails were often fired from a forked rest, or a horn or metal bipod.

Anglo-Afghan Wars

During this period, the jezail was the primary weapon used by the Pashtuns and was used with great effect during the First Anglo-Afghan War. British Brown Bess smoothbore muskets were effective at no more than 150 yards, and unable to be consistently accurate beyond 50 yards. Because of their advantage in range, Pashtun marksmen typically used the jezail from the tops of cliffs along valleys and defiles during ambushes.  This tactic repeatedly inflicted heavy casualties on the British during their 1842 retreat from Kabul to Jalalabad.

In the First Anglo-Afghan War the British established a cantonment outside of Kabul with dirt walls approximately waist high. Surrounding the cantonment were several abandoned forts which, although out of range of British muskets, were close enough for jezail fire.  When ghazi and other Pashtuns forces besieged Kabul and the cantonment, they occupied the forts and used them to snipe at British forces from a safe range.

A description from the British Library dating to the First Anglo-Afghan War:

In British literature
The jezail is most notable, at least in Western literature, as the weapon which wounded Dr. Watson—the fictional biographer of the fictional detective Sherlock Holmes—in the Battle of Maiwand during his military service in Afghanistan. In A Study in Scarlet, Watson mentions being wounded in the shoulder. However, in The Sign of the Four, Watson gives the location of the wound as in his leg. In "The Adventure of the Noble Bachelor" Watson refers to the Jezail bullet being "in one of my limbs." These discrepancies have caused debate by Sherlock Holmes fans about which of these locations is the "correct" location of the wound.

The jezail is mentioned repeatedly in some of Wilbur Smith's books, most notably "Monsoon". It was also mentioned in the George MacDonald Fraser adventure Flashman, whose protagonist describes the awful slaughter of British troops retreating from Kabul to Jalalabad by Pashtun jezailchis. 

The weapon appears in Rudyard Kipling 1886 poem Arithmetic on the Frontier, where the low cost of the weapon is contrasted with the relatively expensive training and education of British officers: 
A scrimmage in a Border Station
A canter down some dark defile
Two thousand pounds of education
Drops to a ten-rupee jezail.

Another reference to the jezail occurs in Kipling's novel The Man Who Would Be King, where the Kohat Jezail is mentioned in the same paragraph as the more advanced Snider and Martini rifles of the British.

P. G. Wodehouse in Jill the Reckless (1920) describes how the character Uncle Chris, in India during his first hill-campaign, would "walk up and down in front of his men under a desultory shower of jezail-bullets".

Contemporary use
The jezail no longer sees widespread use in warfare of any nature. Limited numbers were, however, used by Mujahideen rebels during the Soviet–Afghan War. Derivatives of the jezail, barely recognizable, and usually termed 'country-made weapons', are in use in rural India—especially in the state of Uttar Pradesh.

See also 
 Moukahla, a similar North African musket

References
Citations

Bibliography
 Tanner, Stephen, (2002) Afghanistan: A Military History From Alexander the Great to the Fall of the Taliban, Da Capo Press, 
 "Firearms of the Islamic world in the Tareq Rajab Museum, Kuwait" By Robert Elgood

Indo-Persian weaponry
Muskets
18th-century weapons
19th-century weapons
Weapons of Afghanistan
Rifles of Pakistan
Rifles of India
Weapons of the Ottoman Empire